Boogeyman is a 2005 supernatural horror film directed by Stephen Kay and starring Barry Watson, Emily Deschanel, Skye McCole Bartusiak, and Lucy Lawless. The film is a take on the classic "boogeyman", or monster in the closet, who is the main antagonist of the film. The plot concerns a young man, Tim Jensen, who must confront the childhood terror that has affected his life.

The film was panned by critics, often citing a generic and unoriginal plot as the main criticism. Despite receiving negative reviews from critics, the film was a financial success, and was followed by two direct-to-video sequels, Boogeyman 2 (2007) and Boogeyman 3 (2008).

Plot
During his childhood, Tim Jensen witnesses his father being taken by the Boogeyman, an evil creature which lives in all closets worldwide. Since then, he has taken precautions to ensure that the Boogeyman cannot get to him, such as sleeping on a mattress on the floor, and removing all closets from his home, and keeping all his clothes in a dresser drawer.

After a Thanksgiving trip with his girlfriend Jessica to her parents' house, Tim has a premonition in which his mother tells him to return to the family home. Soon after, he receives a call from his uncle informing him that his mother has died. Upon returning to the psychiatric ward, where he grew up after his father died, he discovers that one of the patients, a young girl, is being terrorized by something hiding in the ceiling of her room.

Upon a suggestion by his psychiatrist that returning to his family home to spend the night in that house would be a good idea, Tim returns to his old Victorian style house in the open country, where he relives memories of his mother telling his father that the Boogeyman does not exist and therefore cannot possibly harm Tim. Tim is briefly attacked by the Boogeyman when he enters the downstairs closet.

Tim meets a young girl in his woodshed, named Franny, who wants to know if it's true that the Boogeyman murdered Tim's father. Searching the woodshed he discovers a  file of Missing Person lists and documents left by Franny, and upon flicking through them, he discovers a disturbing collection of missing children who were all taken by the Boogeyman.

Tim panics and attempts to leave, but Jessica abruptly shows up and takes Tim out of the house for a night to a quiet motel, where she is murdered by the Boogeyman, dragging her into the bath.

Tim returns from getting ice and preparing drinks and enters the bathroom, where he finds that Jessica is missing. He realizes what has occurred, and stumbles blindly into a closet, and then walks out into his family home, just as Kate, his childhood friend, has returned to his home and, upon hearing noises from the closets, was about to open the door herself. Tim drags Kate back to the hotel, where they find the empty bath; this time with blood on the side. Kate begins thinking that Tim might've harmed Jessica; but Tim angrily denies it. Frustrated at Tim's refusal to tell her what is really wrong with him, Kate drives them back to her house where Tim spots something in the window. Kate claims that the person Tim saw was in fact her deaf father. She then calls Tim's Uncle Mike to have him check on Tim. But he is captured and taken away by the Boogeyman.

Tim returns to his house and meets Franny once more, who leads him to a house full of proclamations describing the Boogeyman. There is a chair in the middle of the room facing a closet. Tim remembers this house as being the home of a doctor whom everyone thought was insane. Franny then reveals herself to be the doctor's daughter and one of the kids the Boogeyman took, telling Tim he'd best go to the place where it all started. The Boogeyman pulls Tim through various portals in time through the closet, eventually depositing him in his childhood room. Realizing its true weakness, Tim smashes various toys the Boogeyman uses to give itself form, eventually defeating it, vanishing into the void.

With the Boogeyman gone, Tim hopes that his and Kate's lives will be safer. Morning dawns and Tim already feels better, thinking he's finally safe. However, a post-credits scene reveals a young girl being tormented by the monster, revealing that the Boogeyman has resurfaced out of the closet.

Cast

 Barry Watson as Tim Jensen
 Aaron Murphy as Young Tim Jensen
 Emily Deschanel as Kate Houghton
 Skye McCole Bartusiak as Franny Roberts
 Tory Mussett as Jessica
 Andrew Glover as Boogeyman
 Charles Mesure as Mr. Jensen
 Lucy Lawless as Mary Jensen
 Phil Gordon as Uncle Mike
 Jennifer Rucker as Pam
 Scott Wills as Co-Worker
 Michael Saccente as Jessica's Father
 Louise Wallace as Jessica's Mother
 Brenda Simmons as Jessica's Grandmother
 Josie Tweed as Jessica's Sister
 Ian Campbell as Mr. Roberts
 Robyn Malcolm as Dr. Matheson
 Olivia Tennet as Terrified Girl
 Edward Campbell as Priest
 Andrew Eggleton as Jessica's Brother-in-law

Release
Boogeyman was released on February 4, 2005 by Screen Gems.

Home media
The film was released on VHS and DVD by Sony Pictures Home Entertainment on May 31, 2005, with the DVD release being both on UMD and Special Edition. Universal Pictures released the film on DVD later that same year. It was later released by Sony Pictures in 2006 and 2010, both times as a double feature, with the first release pairing it with When a Stranger Calls and the second with The Fog. Boogeyman debuted on Blu-ray on August 21, 2012, where it was released by Ais.

Reception

Box office
In its opening weekend, the film ranked at #1, grossing $19,020,655 and nearly equaling its production budget. The film grossed $46,752,382 domestically and $20,440,477 internationally, for a worldwide total of $67,192,859.

Critical reception
Boogeyman received largely negative reviews from film critics. The review aggregator website Rotten Tomatoes reports that 13% of 89 critics gave the film a positive review, with an average rating of 3.4/10. The site's consensus states: "The plot is been-there done-that generic, and none of the shock effects can do anything to build up suspense". Metacritic gave the film a 32 out of 100 rating, indicating "generally unfavorable reviews."

Anita Gates from The New York Times gave the film a negative review, writing, "The filmmakers are smart enough to keep the monster out of sight for a long time and then to show only glimpses, but a similar tactic of providing only glimpses of plot and character is disastrous. Moviegoers never learn who or what the boogeyman is, what his particular beef with Tim is, what his powers are and what has stirred up his wrath after all these years," summarizing, "The house is very creaky, but then so is the movie." Marc Savlov from The Austin Chronicle awarded the film one out of five stars, panning the film's pacing, under-lit sets, computer generated effects, and overuse of horror clichés. Frank Wilkins from Reel Talk gave the film a negative review, stating, "Although Boogeyman starts out with a stylishly depicted premise that promises a nightmarish ride into terror, after about twenty minutes the movie falls flat with its cheap terror tactics, its abysmal dialogue and its shamelessly tawdry script." Tom Meek from the Boston Phoenix gave the film one and a half out of four stars, saying, "Director Stephen T. Kay knows how to get under your skin, and Watson nails the internal-turmoil bit, but it’s still just a one-trick pony that comes up lame long before the insipid climax." Jeremy Wheeler from AllMovie complimented Barry Watson and Emily Deschanel's performances, and promising start, but criticized the design of the film's title monster, and the finale, which he called "ridiculous" and "downright embarrassing." Film critic Leonard Maltin awarded the film a mixed two out of four stars, writing, "Despite its predictable blueprint there are a couple of pretty decent scares to be had here... [though] you might consider chapter-skipping on your DVD to get to  the good stuff."

References

External links

 

2005 horror films
2005 films
Films based on urban legends
American haunted house films
Ghost House Pictures films
Screen Gems films
American supernatural horror films
2000s monster movies
Films shot in New Zealand
Films shot in Savannah, Georgia
Films produced by Sam Raimi
Films about fear
Films with screenplays by Stiles White
2000s English-language films
Films directed by Stephen Kay
2000s American films